A Pontifical Delegate is a cleric who is delegated by the Pope.

Specifically, this title is used for the following ecclesiastical offices in the gift of the Pope (who is Pontifex Maximus, hence the adjective):
 a prelate (usually an Archbishop or Cardinal) appointed to represent the Holy See in the administration of certain pontifical minor basilicas, notably:
 Pontifical Delegation for the Basilica of St. Nicholas of Bari
 Pontifical Delegation for the Shrine of the Holy House of Loreto
 Pontifical Delegation for the Basilica of St. Anthony of Padua
 Pontifical Delegation for the Shrine of Our Lady of the Rosary of Pompeii
 a papal legate or papal diplomat, such as a Nuncio
 an extraordinary papal representative to a religious congregation, e.g. the thirty-third General Congregation of the Jesuits
 a papal representative appointed to exercise certain rights reserved, thus limiting the authority of a major archbishop, as in the case of the Syro-Malabar Catholic Church

See also 
 Apostolic delegate
 Pontifical legate

Catholic ecclesiastical titles